"Fell in Love with a Girl" is a song by the American garage rock band the White Stripes, written and produced by Jack White for the band's third studio album, White Blood Cells (2001). Released as the album's second single in February 2002, it peaked at number 21 on both the US Bubbling Under Hot 100 Singles chart and the UK Singles Chart. It was also the band's first single to reach the U.S. Alternative Songs chart, peaking at number 12.

The song was covered in 2003 as "Fell in Love with a Boy" by Joss Stone and as a parody lounge song by Richard Cheese for their 2002 album Tuxicity. It was also included on a polka medley by "Weird Al" Yankovic, "Angry White Boy Polka", from his 2003 album Poodle Hat.

The single was re-released as a 7" vinyl record for Black Friday Record Store Day 2012 on opaque red vinyl by Third Man Records and later issued on standard black vinyl.

Composition
"Fell in Love with a Girl" is an uptempo alternative rock and garage punk song that runs for a duration of one minute and fifty seconds. The track retains a brash rock instrumentation which consists of guitar and drums. It is built a slashing rhythm guitar groove set to a high-speed, stuttering beat with thrashing crash cymbals and skipped snare drum. According to the sheet music published at Musicnotes.com by Universal Music Publishing Group, the song is written in the time signature of common time, with a fast tempo of 192 beats per minute. "Fell in Love with a Girl" is composed in the key of B Major, while Jack White's vocal range spans from a low of B3 to a high of A4. The song has a basic sequence of B–A–D–E during the introduction and verses and follows F–A–D–E–F–A–F at the refrain as its chord progression.

The song opens with Jack White singing his lines with a manic vocal delivery at loud volume. His breathless performance exudes visceral intensity and quirky, exaggerated inflections. White's lyricism contains a dense slew of words laced with anxious banter and snappy humor. The musical arrangement comes to an abrupt halt at the last line of each verse. In substitution of a chorus, "Fell In Love with a Girl" features an infectious backing vocal line. After each verse, Jack White incessantly belts a wordless sing-along composed of "ah-ah-ah-ah" harmonizing.

Critical reception
The single met with widespread critical acclaim.  Comparing it to that of the Ramones, Tom Maginnis from AllMusic called the single, "an attention-grabbing chunk of primal punk rock confection that flames out in a breathless one minute and 50 seconds. ... Surrendering is the only option; to fight against the infectious brutal and relentless energy of "Fell in Love With a Girl" is an exercise in futility." The May 3, 2007 issue of Rolling Stone magazine listed the song as one of the forty songs that changed the world.  In 2011, NME placed it at number 6 on its list "150 Best Tracks of the Past 15 Years".  The Times said that the track "mixes the blues with the Pixies." The Village Voices "Pazz & Jop critics' poll named "Fell in Love with a Girl" the sixth-best song of 2002.

Music video
The music video is a Lego animation directed by Michel Gondry. Gondry's son was featured at the beginning of the video, building Lego blocks. It was shot frame by frame with each frame having the Lego bricks rebuilt, sometimes in a complex manner to seem as if it were an actual shot, and then formed together to give the illusion of motion. The video mostly consists of red, white, and black color. The White Stripes couldn't strike a deal with Lego, so they had to buy a large amount of Lego boxes for the video.

In an interview for The Work of Director Michel Gondry DVD, Jack stated that the White Stripes' long-time collaboration with Gondry started by accident; for "Fell in Love with a Girl", Jack stated that he wanted to work with the director who did Beck's video for "Devils Haircut", referring to Mark Romanek. Their record company mistakenly hired Gondry, thinking he was the director of "Devils Haircut". Jack didn't mind, as he did the video for Beck's "Deadweight", which Jack also liked.

In The Work of Director Michel Gondry interview, Jack also said that the White Stripes contacted the Lego Group in hopes of having a small Lego set packaged with each single of the record, with which one could build a LEGO version of Jack and Meg White. The Lego Group refused, saying: "We don't market our product to people over the age of twelve." However, once the video became a hit, Lego contacted the White Stripes again and asked if they could reconstruct the deal to have Lego packaged with the single. This time, however, Jack White refused.

The Work of Director Michel Gondry DVD also reveals that one section, lasting only a few seconds, used computer animation to simulate the Lego bricks.

Entertainment Weekly said that "the images enhance the lyrics...You can take the metaphor even deeper. As with Legos, love and sex can ultimately take whatever form your imagination desires." Entertainment Weekly included it on its end-of-the-decade, "best-of" list, saying, "An idea so simple it's a wonder no one thought of it before 2002: rock & roll Legos!" Pitchfork deemed it the best video of the decade.

The video was spoofed on the Family Guy episode "Ocean's Three and a Half".

The music video received four nominations for Video of the Year, Breakthrough Video, Best Visual Effects, Best Editing at the 2002 MTV Video Music Awards, winning the latter three.

Track listings
CD single
"Fell in Love with a Girl"
"Let's Shake Hands"
"Lafayette Blues"

CD single (UK Version – Part 2)*
"Fell in Love with a Girl"
"Lovesick" (Live at the Forum, London December 6, 2001)
"I Just Don't Know What to Do with Myself" (Live at BBC Radio-1 Evening Session)**
The single comes with a multimedia section featuring the "Fell in Love with a Girl" video.
*Part 1 with the identical track listing as the US Version.

7" single
"Fell in Love with a Girl"
"I Just Don't Know What to Do with Myself" (Live at BBC Radio-1 Evening Session)**
**This is the same recording of the song that would one year later be an album track on Elephant and eventually be released as a single.

Charts

Certifications and sales

Joss Stone version

In 2003, English singer Joss Stone covered the song, retitled "Fell in Love with a Boy", for her debut studio album, The Soul Sessions (2003). It was released in the United States on January 12, 2004, as the album's lead single. In the United Kingdom, a limited-edition 7-inch single and CD single were issued on January 26, 2004. "Fell in Love with a Boy" debuted and peaked at number 18 on the UK Singles Chart. The song also peaked at number 23 in New Zealand and number 36 in Italy.

Critical reception
The single received mostly positive reviews from critics.  Dorian Lynskey of The Guardian raved that "Fell in Love with a Boy" is the best track from The Soul Sessions as well as "the freshest and most deliciously inauthentic." PopMatters reviewer Jason MacNeil commented that Stone gives the song "a groove-riddled, funky hip-shaker that never loses momentum." Rolling Stone said the tune sounded like "a lost Memphis-soul classic." However, Jim Greer of Entertainment Weekly viewed her version as "the only misguided ploy" on the album. Andrew McGregor wrote for BBC Music that it "blends so well into the funky soul landscape that those less familiar with contemporary rock might miss the ironic juxtaposition altogether."

Track listings
 UK and European CD single
 "Fell in Love with a Boy" 
 "Victim of a Foolish Heart" 

 UK limited-edition 7-inch single
A. "Fell in Love with a Boy" 
B. "Super Duper Love (Are You Diggin' on Me?) Part 1"

 European maxi-single
 "Fell in Love with a Boy" 
 "Victim of a Foolish Heart" 
 "Fell in Love with a Boy"

Credits and personnel
Credits are adapted from the liner notes of The Soul Sessions.

Studios
 Recorded on May 5, 2003, at The Studio (Philadelphia, Pennsylvania)
 Mastered at Sterling Sound (New York City)

Personnel

 Jack White – writing
 Joss Stone – lead vocals
 Angie Stone – background vocals
 Betty Wright – background vocals, production
 Kirk Douglas – guitar
 Adam Blackstone – bass
 James Poyser – keyboards

 Kamal – keyboards
 Ahmir "Questlove" Thompson – drums, production
 Steve Greenberg – production
 Steve Greenwell – engineering, mixing
 Michael Mangini – production
 Chris Gehringer – mastering

Charts

Release history

Other appearances
The Acoustic Album (2006, Virgin)
The song was included in the Punk Rock (play) in 2009.
This song was released as a DLC song for the music video game Rock Band on March 9, 2010.
American rock band Of Montreal performed a version of the song in May 2011 for The A.V. Club A.V. Undercover series.
In the Academy Award-winning film Silver Linings Playbook, this song is incorporated into the dance routine that Pat (Bradley Cooper) and Tiffany (Jennifer Lawrence) perform at the dance competition.
The song was used in a UK television advert for radio station BBC Radio 6 Music. The advert depicted the first dance at a wedding, with the DJ choosing to play The White Stripes as opposed to the chosen song, much to the consternation of the family.
"Fell in Love with a Girl" was the final song played on the airwaves of the influential Providence, Rhode Island radio station WBRU on August 31, 2017. After the song played, the DJs signed off and the radio fell silent. WBRU now operates exclusively as an internet radio station.

References

External links
 
 

2001 songs
2002 singles
Fell in Love with a Boy
Fell in Love with a Boy
Lego films
Animated music videos
Music videos directed by Michel Gondry
Relentless Records singles
Stop-motion animated music videos
Third Man Records singles
Virgin Records singles
The White Stripes songs
XL Recordings singles